
Karl Göbel (20 January 1900 – 2 March 1945) was a general in the Wehrmacht of Nazi Germany during World War II. He was a recipient of the Knight's Cross of the Iron Cross with Oak Leaves. Göbel was wounded on 16 February 1945 in the Courland Pocket and died on 2 March 1945. He was posthumously promoted to Generalmajor.

Awards and decorations
 Iron Cross (1939) 2nd Class (16 June 1940) & 1st Class (3 August 1941) 
 Honour Roll Clasp of the Army (17 November 1944)
 German Cross in Gold on 24 May 1942 as Major in the III./Infanterie-Regiment 419
 Knight's Cross of the Iron Cross with Oak Leaves
 Knight's Cross on 10 September 1942 as Major and commander of III./Infanterie-Regiment 420
 Oak Leaves on 8 June 1943 as Oberstleutnant and commander of Grenadier-Regiment 420

References

Citations

Bibliography

 
 
 

1900 births
1945 deaths
German Army personnel killed in World War II
Recipients of the Knight's Cross of the Iron Cross with Oak Leaves
Recipients of the Gold German Cross
People from Eichstätt (district)
Military personnel from Bavaria
Major generals of the German Army (Wehrmacht)
German Army personnel of World War I
Posthumous recognitions